German submarine U-158 was a Type IXC U-boat of Nazi Germany's Kriegsmarine built for service during World War II.

Her keel was laid down on 1 November 1940 by DeSchiMAG AG Weser in Bremen as yard number 1000. She was commissioned on 25 September 1941, with Kapitänleutnant Erwin Rostin (Knights Cross) in command.

Design
German Type IXC submarines were slightly larger than the original Type IXBs. U-158 had a displacement of  when at the surface and  while submerged. She had two shafts and two  propellers.

U-158 was fitted with six  torpedo tubes (four fitted at the bow and two at the stern), 22 torpedoes, one  SK C/32 naval gun, 180 rounds, and a  SK C/30 as well as a  C/30 anti-aircraft gun. The boat had a complement of forty-eight.

Service history
U-158 conducted only two combat patrols, sinking 17 ships totalling  and damaging two others totalling 15,264 GRT.

First patrol
U-158 departed the German administered island of Helgoland, (sometimes spelt 'Heligoland'), for her first patrol on 7 February 1942. Her route took her north of the British Isles, through the gap between Iceland and the Faroe Islands and into the Atlantic Ocean.

The ship broke in two after being hit and the stern section was last seen on 4 March. In the same attack, the U-boat also damaged Diloma. This tanker was able to proceed under her own power at reduced speed. She was repaired in Baltimore and returned to service in June 1942.

The submarine then moved further down the US east coast. She sank another four ships and damaged one more. They were: Finnanger (1 March), Caribsea (11 March), John D. Gill (13 March), Olean (damaged on 15 March) and Ario (also on 15 March).
 
John D. Gill was another tanker; her cargo did not ignite on being hit by a torpedo. Instead, the surrounding water was turned into a blazing inferno after a seaman threw a life ring overboard and its built-in carbide lamp malfunctioned. Almost half the crew died.

Olean was towed to Hampton Roads, rebuilt and renamed Sweep and then returned to service.

Having caused so much mayhem, the boat sailed for France, arriving at Lorient on 31 March 1942.

Second patrol
For her second foray, U-158 moved into the Caribbean and the Gulf of Mexico in May 1942.

Following the sinking of Knoxville City on 2 June, the survivors in their lifeboats declined an offer of help from Jamaica as they thought the German submarine was still nearby.

The Hermis, despite being hit by two torpedoes on the seventh, maintained a speed of eight knots due to the engines still running. The U-boat surfaced and shelled the ship. She was observed some twelve hours later with her stern out of the water; she eventually sank shortly afterward.

Fate
U-158 was sunk on 30 June 1942, west of the Bermudas, in position , by depth charges from a PBM Mariner aircraft commanded by Richard Schreder of United States Navy Squadron VP-74. None of her 54 crewmen on board survived the sinking.

Summary of raiding history

References

Notes

Citations

Bibliography

External links

German Type IX submarines
U-boats commissioned in 1941
World War II submarines of Germany
1941 ships
U-boats sunk in 1942
U-boats sunk by depth charges
U-boats sunk by US aircraft
Shipwrecks in the Atlantic Ocean
Ships built in Bremen (state)
Ships lost with all hands
Maritime incidents in June 1942